The Hùng Kings' Temple Festival is a Vietnamese festival held annually from the 8th to the 11th day of the third lunar month in honour of the Hùng Vương or Hùng Kings. The main festival day, which is a public holiday in Vietnam since 2007, is on the 10th day.

Although the official name is the Death Anniversary of the Hùng Kings, the festival does not mark any specific date of death for any Hùng King.

Festival
The purpose of this ceremony is to remember and pay tribute to the Hung kings who are the traditional founders and first kings of the nation. The festival began as a local holiday, but has become recognized as a national holiday starting in 2007. In 2016, the total number of visitors to the festival numbered seven million.

The major ceremony
The ceremony takes place over several days, but the 10th day of the month is considered the most important. 
A procession starts at the foot of the mountain, and stops at every small temple before reaching the High Temple. Here, pilgrims offer prayers and incense to their ancestors.

See also 
 Giỗ
 Ancestor worship in Vietnam

References

Public holidays in Vietnam
Vietnamese culture
Observances set by the Vietnamese calendar
April observances